Pinelands United SC is a Barbados football club, based in Pinelands, a neighborhood within Bridgetown.

They play in the Barbados' first division, the Barbados Premier Division.

Achievements
Barbados Premier Division: 3
 1982, 1985, 1992
Division One Champions 2010
KnockOut Champions 1987

References

Football clubs in Barbados